Hexachaeta abscura is a species of tephritid or fruit flies in the genus Hexachaeta of the family Tephritidae.

References

abscura